Francis Lovett Carter-Cotton (October 11, 1843 – November 20, 1919) was a Canadian newspaperman, politician, and businessman. He served as a BC MLA from 1890 to 1900 and from 1903 to 1916.

Born in Shoreditch (London), England, the son of Francis Cotton and Martha Ann Garrison, he was the co-owner and editor of the Vancouver, British Columbia Daily News-Advertiser newspaper from 1887 to 1910. He was elected to the Legislative Assembly of British Columbia in 1890 and was re-elected in 1894 and 1898. He was defeated in 1900.

He was elected again in 1903 and served until 1916. From 1898 to 1900, he was the minister of finance and agriculture. From 1899 to 1900, he was the chief commissioner of lands and works. From 1904 to 1910, he was the president of the legislative council.

In 1912, he was appointed the first chancellor of the University of British Columbia and served until 1918. In 1913 he was elected Chairman of the Vancouver Board of Trade.

He died in 1919.

References

1843 births
1919 deaths
British Columbia Conservative Party MLAs
Chancellors of the University of British Columbia
English emigrants to Canada
People from Shoreditch